Kabardino-Balkaria, officially the Kabardino-Balkarian Republic, is a republic of Russia located in the North Caucasus. As of the 2021 Census, its population was 904,200. Its capital is Nalchik. Mount Elbrus has 22 glaciers that feed three rivers — Baksan, Malka and Kuban. The mountain is covered with snow year-round.

Geography

The republic is situated in the North Caucasus mountains, with plains in the northern part. The republic shares an international border with Georgia.
Area: 
Borders:
internal: Stavropol Krai (N/NE), North Ossetia–Alania (E/SE/S), Karachay–Cherkessia (W/NW)
international: Georgia (Racha-Lechkhumi and Kvemo Svaneti, Zemo Svaneti) (S/SW)
Highest point: Mount Elbrus (5,642 m)
Maximum N->S distance: 
Maximum E->W distance: 

Kabardino-Balkaria is traversed by the northeasterly line of equal latitude and longitude.

Rivers
Major rivers include:
Terek River (623 km)
Malka River (216 km)
Baksan River (173 km)
Urukh River (104 km)
Chegem River (102 km)
Cherek River (76 km)
Argudan River
Kurkuzhin River
Lesken River

Lakes

There are about 100 lakes in the Republic, none of which is large. Some of the lakes are:
Tserikkel Lake (area 26,000 m2; depth 368 m)
Lower Goluboye Lake
Kel-Ketchen Lake (depth 177 m)
Upper Tserikkel Lake (depth 18 m)
Sekretnoye Lake
Tambukan Lake (area 1.77 km2; depth 1.5 to 2 m), partially within Stavropol Krai.

Mountains
Mount Elbrus (5,642 m), a volcanic mountain and the highest peak in Europe, Russia, and the Caucasus
Other major mountains include:
Mount Dykhtau (5,402 m)
Mount Koshtantau (5,151 m)
Mount Shkhara (5,068 m)
Pushkin Peak (5,033 m)
Mount Mizhergi (5,025 m)

Natural resources

Kabardino-Balkaria's natural resources include molybdenum, tungsten, and coal.

Climate
The republic has a continental type climate.
Average annual precipitation: 500–2,000 mm.

History

Politics
The head of government in Kabardino-Balkaria is the Head. The current Head is Kazbek Kokov. The legislative body of the Republic is the Parliament comprising 72 deputies elected for a five-year term.

The republic adopted a new constitution in 2001 which prevents the republic from existing independently of the Russian Federation.

Administrative divisions

Demographics

Population
Population: 

Life expectancy:

Vital statistics
Source: Russian Federal State Statistics Service 

Note: TFR 2009, 2010, 2011, 2012 source.

Ethnic groups
Kabardino-Balkaria includes two major ethnic communities, the Kabardins (Circassians), who speak a North-West Caucasian language, and the Balkars who speak a Turkic language. According to the 2021 Census, Kabardins make up 57.1% of the republic's population, followed by Russians (19.8%) and Balkars (13.7%). Other groups include Cherkess (3.0%), Turks (1.9%), Ossetians (0.8%), Romani (0.5%), and a host of smaller groups, each accounting for less than 0.5% of the total population.

Religion

According to a 2012 survey which interviewed 56,900 people, 70.8% of the population of Kabardino-Balkaria adheres to Islam, 11.6% to the Russian Orthodox Church, 1.8% to Adyghe (Kabardian) folk religion and other indigenous faiths, 3.8% are unaffiliated generic Christians. In addition, 12% of the population declares to be "spiritual but not religious", 5.6% is Atheist or follows other religions including Jehovah's Witnesses.

See also
Caucasian Avars
Bulgars
List of the Chairmen of the Parliament of the Kabardino-Balkarian Republic
Minor hydro-electric plants of Kabardino-Balkaria
Mount Imeon

Notes

References

Sources

External links

 Official website of the Head of the Republic
Pictures of the Kabardino-Balkarian Republic
BBC News. Kabardino-Balkaria Profile

 
North Caucasus
States and territories established in 1936
1936 establishments in the Soviet Union
Russian-speaking countries and territories
Regions of Europe with multiple official languages
North Caucasian Federal District